The Cleveland Blues were a professional baseball franchise that played in the National League (NL) from 1879 until 1884. The team employed six individuals in the capacity of on-field manager. Four of the six were also player-managers.

The first manager for the Blues was Jim McCormick, who was also the team's main pitcher. He stayed in that capacity for two seasons, winning just 74 of 167 games from 1879 to 1880. In 1882, he managed four more games, but did not win any of them. The franchise's all-time leader in managerial wins (55) and winning percentage (.567) was Frank Bancroft, their first non-playing manager.

Managers

References

External links
Retrosheet.org

 
Cleveland Blues (NL)
Blues (NL) managers